MLB.com is the official site of Major League Baseball and is overseen by Major League Baseball Advanced Media, L.P. (a subsidiary of MLB). MLB.com is a source of baseball-related information, including baseball news, statistics, and sports columns. MLB.com is also a commercial site, providing online streaming video and streaming audio broadcasts of all Major League Baseball games to paying subscribers, as well as "gameday", a near-live streaming box score of baseball games for free. In addition, MLB.com sells official baseball merchandise, allows users to buy tickets to baseball games, runs fantasy baseball leagues, and runs auctions of baseball memorabilia. In association with HB Studios,  MLB.com has also developed recent R.B.I. Baseball installments.

MLB.tv
MLB.tv is an American subscription based audio and video service which through two different service tiers allows users to listen and watch HD quality out of market Major League Baseball games live via a high-speed Internet connection (subject to blackout restrictions). Currently users can subscribe to the "MLB.tv All Teams" package which access to every MLB teams live feeds as well as in-game highlights and stats and live DVR control, full game archives and pitch widget. The other option, the "MLB.tv Single Team" gives subscribers access to a single MLB team's live audio and video feeds (subject to blackout restrictions) as well as in-game highlights, stats and live DVR controls.

Previously MLB.tv services were offered as a "Basic" and "Premium" tiers with basic receiving only HD quality audio and video on their desktop or laptop devices whereas the Premium subscribers were given access to live game audio and video on desktop and laptop as well as on mobile devices such as Android or iOS devices through a free subscription to the At-Bat mobile app and through certain connected devices including smart televisions, Blu-ray players, TiVo DVRs, PlayStation 3, PlayStation 4, PlayStation 5, Xbox 360, and Xbox One. MLB.TV has since eliminated these restrictions and now users of both the "All Teams" and "Single Team" tier can share the same access including new access via an Amazon Fire TV, Google Chromecast and Roku devices.

Starting with the 2012 season MLB.TV Premium had begun a service called Audio Overlay which allows the user to replace the video's home or away audio with the audio feed from the home or away radio feed (Away team audio overlay is only available to MLB.TV Premium subscribers) or Park which removes all audio commentary and lets the viewer hear the ball park's natural sounds. As with MLB's Extra Innings cable and satellite television service, normal blackout restrictions apply where applicable, see below. This service has since been discontinued starting with the new subscription tier.

MLB.tv Mosaic

Mosaic was a downloadable program which provided features not available when streaming through a web browser. It was only available to subscribers of MLB.tv Premium. Live games were shown, and on-demand games available for a period of two days previous to the current date. Major League Baseball has not used MLB.tv Mosaic since the 2008 season.

Mosaic allowed you to show multiple games at once, and provided the following viewing modes:

 6 games tiled across the screen
 4 games tiled across the screen
 One main game, with 2 games tiled on the right hand side
 One main game, with 3 games tiled on the right hand side
 One main game (which can be made full-screen)

When set on one main game, team information was shown to the right hand side of the game, including team line-ups, the boxscore, and team statistics. Users could also view their "player tracker", which would alert the user when a player in their chosen player list was active in a game.

Beginning with the 2009 season, Mosaic functionality was largely incorporated into the main viewing mode. Multiple-game viewing has been retained, with a choice of one, two side to side, two (one in the main window and one in a secondary 'picture in picture' mode), and four-game mode available.

MLB Big Inning 
MLB Big Inning is a feature of MLB.tv, which presents whiparound coverage of MLB games that air on the MLB.tv service, including live action and highlights. The service was introduced in 2021, and airs every weeknight. Alexa Datt is the host of the show.

The service is similar to the existing MLB Strike Zone service; both services air a similar whiparound format.

Blackout restrictions
MLB.com has been providing live and archived streaming video since the 2002 baseball season with only audio available before that. MLB games in the United States, Canada, South Korea, Guam and the U.S. Virgin Islands are subject to blackout restrictions. In Guam all of the live Los Angeles Dodgers and Oakland A's games are blackout for the entire season. Games are blacked out to all users within the theoretical home television territory assigned to each team, irrespective of whether local television stations carry local games of those teams. Contractual stipulations with Fox and ESPN respectively mean that regular season Saturday games scheduled before 1900 EST (beginning 20 May 2006) and Sunday games scheduled after 17:00 EST are blacked out throughout the United States. During the post-season, all games are blacked out in the United States, Canada, Japan, South Korea, Guam, and the US Virgin Islands. In all other countries and territories, no exclusivity rights have been granted and MLB.com is able to broadcast all games. MLB Gameday Audio does not have blackout restrictions.

Any game that is blacked out (for any reason) is made available as an archived game approximately 90 minutes after the conclusion of each game.

MLB.com can check a viewer's origin by using IP address information, but some users have reported inaccuracy of the ISP-based targeting used, thus leaving many fans unable to watch games on MLB.com.

MLB.com At Bat

MLB.com At Bat was a mobile application available for different platforms including iOS (a universal app which works on iPhone and iPod Touch), iPadOS, Android, BlackBerry, and HP TouchPad/webOS. The iOS application featured "live audio, in-game video highlights, pitch-by-pitch live data and more." (Users may view live games if they log in with MLB.tv subscriptions.) The BlackBerry and Android application featured "real-time scores, live audio, in-game highlights and more." The application was free (although it required a subscription to MLB.TV to unlock its full functionality) and was available on the App Store, Google Play, and BlackBerry App World stores. MLB distributes a new application for each season; the 2012 version was the first to be available free of charge. Later the app’s functionality was integrated into the standard MLB app, and it has since been removed. 

A social networking app, MLB Ballpark, is also available. The free app allows fans to view ballpark maps, post to assorted social networking sites (via 'checking in' when they attend games), and in some ballparks, order concessions directly from their mobile devices.

MLB.com Fantasy
MLB.com Fantasy has many games and simulations, including Beat the Streak. Beat the Streak is a game where a player is picked for each day, and if that player gets at least one hit, one's streak continues. The goal is to reach a 57-game streak (one more than Joe DiMaggio's famed 56-game streak), to win a grand total of $5.6 million. The contest has never had a winner in its 17-year history, despite some tweaks to make the goal more attainable.

History
Major League Baseball's previous website was at www.MajorLeagueBaseball.com. The MLB.com domain name was originally registered in 1994 by Morgan, Lewis & Bockius LLP, a Philadelphia-based law firm. In September 2000, Morgan Lewis & Bockius agreed to transfer the domain name to Major League Baseball. The longer address remains as a redirect to MLB.com to prevent cybersquatting.

Customer service complaints
According to the Better Business Bureau:
"Consumers previously reported to the BBB their subscriptions were automatically renewed with MLB Advanced Media even though they had cancelled their plans within the specified cancellation period. MLB Advanced Media has taken steps to address these concerns by adding more prominent disclosures and an opt-out feature."

In 2009, opening week games were not available as archives, and users reported limited High Definition service available.

References

External links

Major League Baseball websites
Internet television channels